A skipping rope  or jump rope  is a tool used in the sport of skipping/jump rope where one or more participants jump over a rope swung so that it passes under their feet and over their heads. There are multiple subsets of skipping/jump rope, including single freestyle, single speed, pairs, three-person speed (Double Dutch), and three-person freestyle (Double Dutch freestyle).

Rope skipping is commonly performed as an exercise or recreational activity, and there are also several major organizations that support jump rope as a competitive sport. Often separated by sex and age, events include hundreds of competitive teams all around the world. In the US, schools rarely have jump rope teams, and few states have sanctioned official events at the elementary school level. In freestyle events, jumpers use a variety of basic and advanced techniques in a routine of one minute, which is judged by a head judge, content judges, and performance judges. In speed events, a jumper alternates their feet with the rope going around the jumper every time one of their feet hits the ground for 30 seconds, one minute, or three minutes. The jumper is judged on the number of times the right foot touches the ground in those times.

History

Explorers reported seeing aborigines jumping with vines in the 16th century. European boys started skipping in the early 17th century. The activity was considered indecent for girls due to concerns of them showing their ankles. Girls began skipping in the 18th century, adding skipping chants, owning the rope, controlling the game, and deciding who may participate.

In the United States, domination of the activity by girls emerged as their families moved into cities in the late 19th century. There, they found sidewalks and other smooth surfaces conducive to skipping, along with a high density of peers with whom to engage in the sport.

Techniques
There are many techniques that can be used when skipping. These can be used individually or combined in a series to create a routine.

Solo participants 
For solo jumping, the participant jumps and swings the rope under their feet. The timing of the swing is matched to the jump. This allows them to jump the rope and establish a rhythm more successfully. This can be contrasted with swinging the rope at the feet and jumping, which would mean they were matching the jump to the swing. This makes it harder to jump the rope and establish a rhythm.

Basic jump or easy jump
Jump with both feet slightly apart over the rope. Beginners usually master this technique first before moving onto more advanced techniques.

Alternate foot jump (speed step)
Use alternate feet to jump off the ground. This technique can be used to effectively double the number of jumps per minute as compared to the above technique. This step can be used for speed events.

Criss-cross
Also known as crossover or cross arms. Perform the basic jump whilst crossing arms in front of the body.

Side swing
The rope is passed by the side of the participant's body without jumping it.

EB (front-back cross or sailor)
Perform the criss-cross whilst crossing one arm behind the back.

Double under
A high basic jump, turning the rope twice under the feet. Turning the rope three times is called a triple under. In competitions, participants may attempt quadruple (quads) and quintuple under (quins) using the same method.

Boxer jump
One foot is positioned slightly forward and one foot slightly back. The person positions their bodyweight primarily over their front foot, with the back foot acting as a stabiliser. From this stance, the person jumps up several times (often 2-3 times) before switching their stance, so the front foot becomes the back foot, and the back foot becomes the front foot. And so forth. An advantage of this technique is that it allows the back leg a brief rest. So while both feet are still used in the jump, a person may find they can skip for longer than if they were using the basic two-footed technique.

Toad
Perform the criss-cross with one arm crossing under the opposite leg from the inside.

Leg over / Crougar
A basic jump with one arm hooked under the adjacent leg.

Awesome Annie
Also known as Awesome Anna or swish. Alternates between a leg over and a toad without a jump in between.

Inverse toad
Perform the toad whilst one arm crosses the adjacent leg from the outside.

Elephant
A cross between the inverse toad and the toad, with both arms crossing under one leg.

Frog or Donkey kick
The participant does a handstand, returns to their feet, and turns the rope under them. A more advanced version turns the rope during the return to the ground.

TJ
A triple-under where the first 'jump' is a side swing, the middle jump is a toad and the final jump in the open.

Competition techniques 

In competitions, participants are required to demonstrate competence using specific techniques. The selection depends on the judging system and the country in which the tournament is held.

Health effects
Skipping may be used as a cardiovascular workout, similar to jogging or bicycle riding, and has a high MET or intensity level. This aerobic exercise can achieve a "burn rate" of up to 700 to over 1,200 calories per hour of vigorous activity, with about 0.1 to nearly 1.1 calories consumed per jump, mainly depending upon the speed and intensity of jumps and leg foldings.  Ten minutes of skipping are roughly the equivalent of running an eight-minute mile. Skipping for 15–20 minutes is enough to burn off the calories from a candy bar and is equivalent to 45–60 minutes of running, depending upon the intensity of jumps and leg swings.
Many professional trainers, fitness experts, and professional fighters greatly recommend skipping for burning fat over any other alternative exercises like running and jogging.

Weighted skipping ropes are available for such athletes to increase the difficulty and effectiveness of such exercise. Individuals or groups can participate in the exercise, and learning proper techniques is relatively simple compared to many other athletic activities. The exercise is also appropriate for a wide range of ages and fitness levels.

Skipping grew in popularity in 2020 when gyms closed or people stayed home due to coronavirus restrictions across the world. These workouts can be done at home and do not require specialized equipment.

Competition

International
The world governing body for the sport of jump rope is the International Jump Rope Union (IJRU). It is a merger of two previous rival world organizations: the International Rope Skipping Federation (FISAC-IRSF), and the World Jump Rope Federation (WJRF). There have been 11 World Championships on every alternate year by FISAC-IRSF, with the final competition being held in Shanghai, China. There have been 7 World Jump Rope Championships held every year by (WJRF); the final competition taking place in Oslo, Norway. Previous locations of this championship included Washington DC, Orlando, France, and Portugal. IJRU plans to hold its inaugural World Jump Rope Championship in Colorado Springs, Colorado in 2023.

In 2018, FISAC-IRSF and WJRF announced the merger organization IJRU. IJRU has become the 10th International Federation to gain GAISF Observer status. The decision was taken by the Global Association of International Sports Federations (GAISF) Council, which met during SportAccord in Bangkok. Observer status is the first step on a clear pathway for new International Federations towards the top of the Olympic Family pyramid. Those who wish to proceed will be assisted by GAISF, leading them into full GAISF membership through the Alliance of Independent Recognised Members of Sport (AIMS), and the Association of IOC Recognised International Sports Federations (ARISF).

In 2019 the International Rope Skipping Organisation (IRSO). re-emerged and reactivated its activities as governing body of Rope Skipping / Jump Rope sport. The organization is headed by Richard Cendali, who is referred to as the grandfather of the sport of jump rope. IRSO had disagreements with both FISAC-IRSF and WJRF for ignoring several long-standing organizations in their merger. Various jump rope organizations that were long-standing for the development of the sport were left out of the merger of IJRU and came under IRSO under the leadership of Richard Cendali. The USA Jump Rope Federation and newly formed Asian Rope Skipping Association also joined IRSO and decided to host their World Championship in conjunction with AAU.

World Inter School
The first World Inter-School Rope Skipping Championship was held at Dubai, November 2015. The second World Inter-School Rope Skipping Championship was held at Eger, Hungary. The Championship was organized by World Inter School Rope Skipping Organisation (WIRSO). Second, third and fourth World Inter-School championships held in Hungary 2017, Hong Kong 2018 and Belgium 2019 respectively.

Locations

United States
Historically, there were two competing jump rope organizations in the United States: the International Rope Skipping Organization (IRSO), and the World Rope Skipping Federation (WRSF). IRSO focused on stunt-oriented and gymnastic/athletic type moves, while WRSF appreciated the aesthetics and form of the exercise. In 1995, these two organizations merged to form the United States Amateur Jump Rope Federation which is today now known as USA Jump Rope (USAJR). USAJR has hosted annual national tournaments, as well as camps, workshops, and clinics on instruction since 1995. Jump rope is also part of the Amateur Athletic Union and participates in their annual AAU Junior Olympic Games. More recently, the American Jump Rope Federation was founded in 2016 by previous members of WJRF. It is recognized as the official governing body for the sport of jump rope in the United States by IJRU.

Types of jump ropes 
Speed jump ropes are made from a thin vinyl cord or wire and are primarily used for speed jumping or double unders. They are best for indoor use, because they will wear down fast on concrete or other harsh surfaces. Licorice jump ropes are also made from vinyl cord or PVC and are primarily used for freestyle jumping. The beaded ropes make rhythmic jumping very easy, because the jumper can hear the beads hitting the ground and strive for a rhythmic pattern. Leather jump ropes are thicker and is less likely to tangle or wear down with outdoor use.

See also
Chinese jump rope

References

Further reading

 Compares jumping rope to other exercises

External links

Aerobic exercise
Games of physical skill
Girls' toys and games
Physical activity and dexterity toys
Traditional toys
Jumping sports